Love Fraud is an American true crime documentary miniseries, directed by Heidi Ewing and Rachel Grady, about the hunt for a serial romance scammer. It premiered on August 30, 2020, on Showtime.

Production
The filmmakers wanted to make a series about a con artist, but not one that was a cold case, resolved, or well known. They decided on their subject after producer Alex Takats read the blog of a woman who had accused her former husband of fraud. There was an arrest warrant, but his whereabouts were unknown. The filmmakers decided not to be a "fly on the wall", but instead intervene to fund the investigation. The series began filming in December 2017.

Release
The series had its world premiere at the Sundance Film Festival on January 23, 2020. It was initially scheduled to premiere on Showtime on May 8, 2020, but this was delayed to August 30, 2020, due to the COVID-19 pandemic.

Subject
The series is a "manhunt", following efforts of private detectives hired by the filmmakers, including bounty hunter Carla Campbell, to find a man from Lenexa, Kansas named Richard Scott Smith. Smith was accused by multiple women, including some he married, of romance scams. He is accused of being married at least ten times and to more than one woman at a time, and being accused of using multiple identities. His former partners accused him of using their identities to make purchases and obtain credit, leaving them severely in debt. He was put on probation in 2015 in Polk County, Iowa after being charged with domestic abuse assault. After one former partner went to the police in 2017, he pleaded guilty to identity theft and received a 10 month jail sentence, later violating probation.

The women each tell their stories of how they met Smith and came to be duped, and the film explores what led Smith to act in these ways. Smith appears on camera in the final episode in "what can most charitably be described as a dumpster fire of an interview", according to the Kansas City Star.

Reception
On Rotten Tomatoes, the series holds an approval rating of 92% based on 24 reviews, with an average rating of 8/10. The website's critical consensus reads, "Explosive, but never exploitive, Love Fraud tells a thrilling tale of online dating gone terribly wrong with expert precision and a welcome dose of empathy."  On Metacritic, the series holds a rating of 77 out of 100, based on 13 critics, indicating "generally favorable reviews".

Episodes

Accolades

References

External links
 

2020 American television series debuts
2020 American television series endings
2020s American documentary television series
Documentary television series about crime in the United States
English-language television shows
Showtime (TV network) original programming
True crime television series